The  Athenian League was an English amateur football league for clubs in and around London. The league was originally to be called the Corinthian League, but this name was rejected by the Football Association. It was formed in 1912 with ten clubs, but had to close down in 1914 due to the onset of World War I. When it reformed in 1920, only three of the previous teams rejoined. Clubs left and joined the league at a rate of about one a year, with a number leaving to join the Isthmian League, the strongest amateur league in the London area. Total membership remained fairly stable at between twelve and sixteen clubs until 1963, when it absorbed most of the clubs from two rival leagues, the Corinthian League (most of whose former clubs formed Division One) and the Delphian League (most of whose former clubs formed Division Two). The existing division was renamed the Premier Division.

Over the following years it lost many clubs to stronger leagues, particularly the Isthmian League and Southern League, and successive waves of Isthmian League expansion in 1973, 1977 and 1984 finally forced the league to disband. The league was amongst the first in England to be sponsored by an external company when, in the late 1970s, it was billed as the Kingsmead Athenian League.

Champions
The champion clubs were as follows:

In 1963 the league expanded to three divisions

In 1973 the league was reduced to two divisions

In 1977 the league was reduced to a single division

Member clubs
The league had 115 member clubs during its existence:

Addlestone
Alton Town
Aveley
Aylesbury United
Banstead Athletic
Barking
Barnet
Barnet & Alston
Basildon United
Berkhamsted Town
Billericay Town
Bishop's Stortford
Boreham Wood
Brentwood & Warley
Bromley
Burnham
Camberley Town
Cambridge City
Carshalton Athletic
Catford Southend
Chalfont St Peter
Chelmsford
Chertsey Town
Chesham Town
Chesham United
Cheshunt
Croydon
Dagenham
Dorking

Eastbourne Town
Eastbourne United
Edgware Town
Edmonton
Egham Town
Enfield
Epping Town
Epsom & Ewell
Erith & Belvedere
Farnborough Town
Faversham Town
Feltham
Finchley
Flackwell Heath
Fleet Town
Grays Athletic
Guildford
Hampton
Harefield United
Haringey Borough
Harlow Town
Harrow Borough
Harwich & Parkeston
Hastings & St Leonards
Hayes
Hemel Hempstead Town
Hendon
Herne Bay
Hertford Town

Histon
Hitchin Town
Hoddesdon Town
Horley Town
Hornchurch
Horsham
Hounslow
Kingsbury Town
Kingstonian
Leatherhead
Letchworth Garden City
Lewes
Leyton
Leyton-Wingate
Luton Clarence
Maidenhead United
Maidstone United
Marlow
Metrogas
Molesey
Newbury Town
Rainham Town
Redhill
Romford
Romford Town
Ruislip Manor
Slough Town
Southall

St Albans City
Staines Town
Summerstown
Sutton United
Thatcham Town
Tilbury
Tooting
Tooting & Mitcham
Tring Town
Tufnell Park
Uxbridge
Uxbridge Town
Walthamstow Avenue
Walton & Hersham
Ware
Wealdstone
Welling United
Wembley
West London Old Boys
West Norwood
Whyteleafe
Willesden
Wimbledon
Windsor & Eton
Wingate
Wokingham Town
Wolverton Town
Woodford Town
Worthing

References

 
Defunct football leagues in England
Football competitions in London